In Buddhist philosophy, Svasaṃvedana (also Svasaṃvitti) is a term which refers to the self-reflexive nature of consciousness. It was initially a theory of cognition held by the Mahasamghika and Sautrantika schools while the Sarvastivada-Vaibhasika school argued against it.

The idea was famously defended by the Indian philosopher Dignaga, and is an important doctrinal term in Indian Mahayana thought and Tibetan Buddhism. It is also often translated as self cognition or self apperception.

Sources in the Buddhist schools 
According to Zhihua Yao, the theory was first presented by the Mahasamghika school. Their view was preserved in the Sarvastivada compendium of Abhidharma called Maha-Vibhasa and states:It is the nature (svabhava) of awareness (jñana) and so forth to apprehend, thus awareness can apprehend itself as well as others. This is like a lamp that can illuminate itself and others owing to its nature of luminosity.The issue is also discussed in the Theravadin Katthavatthu (section V.9) in a dialogue between a Theravadin and an Andhaka (the Mahasamghikas in the Andhra region). In the dialogue, the Andhaka is asked by the Theravadin if one knows an awareness of the present by that same awareness. The Andhaka first denies this, but then affirms it when asked again. In the commentary to the Katthavatthu, Buddhaghosa explains this because "continuity is concerned", thus if seen by itself a mind moment cannot know itself but in a continuous stream of mind moments it can thus be said. The Theravadin counters with the argument that the other aggregates like feeling do not feel themselves and uses similes like a knife that cannot cut itself or a needle that does not pierce itself. The Andhaka then recovers by making the following argument for his position of self cognition:But, when all phenomena are seen as impermanent, is not that awareness also seen as impermanent?Sarvastivada sources which discuss self-cognition mainly do so in order to refute the idea that a mind moment can know itself in that moment. These include the Jñanaprasthana and Mahavibhasa. However that does not mean the Sarvastivadins reject all theories of self cognition, they developed their own theory which argued that mind moments know themselves only reflexively in regards to the previous mind moments. As Zhihua Yao states, "in other words, the mind knows itself through a reflection of the past mind". The Sarvastivadins use their metaphysical theory of the real existence of the past, present and future to allow for a present mind to take a past mind as itself.

Sautrantika authors also discussed the theory. It was extensively covered by the Harivarman, the author of the Tattvasiddhishastra, and shows that he was in a dialogue with both Sarvastivada and Mahasamghika views. Harivarman's view argues against the Mahasamghika's simultaneous model of self-cognition and instead argues that self-cognition is only seen in the course of successive moments of cognition. That is, it involves multiple mental processes which Harivarman considers as happening in the "present continuum" and is not a case of a single mind moment knowing itself but is a case of the mind grasping the "image" (akara) of itself as it is fading away. This is also part of his account of how memory works.

The Buddhist philosopher Dignaga also defended a theory of svasamvedana drawing on Sautrantika and Yogacara influences. For Dignaga, svasamvedana is a kind of perception (pratyaksa) which is an "internal awareness of mental consciousness" and his theory of perception also entails that it is non-conceptual (unlike the other source of valid cognition, anumana - inference).

Mahayana scholasticism
Svasaṃvedana is at the root of a major doctrinal disagreement in Indian Mahayana Buddhism. While defended by the Yogacara thinkers such as Dharmakirti and the eclectic Santaraksita, it was attacked by 'Prasangika Madhyamika' thinkers such as Candrakirti and Santideva. Since in Mādhyamika thought all dharmas are empty of inherent essence (Svabhava), they argued that consciousness could not be an inherently reflexive ultimate reality since that would mean it was self validating and therefore not characterized by emptiness.

In Tibetan Buddhism there are various competing views regarding svasaṃvedana (Tibetan: Ranggi rig pa).

In the Nyingma school's Dzogchen tradition, svasaṃvedana is often called 'the very nature of mind' (sems kyi chos nyid) and metaphorically referred to as 'luminosity' (gsal ba) or 'clear light' ('od gsal). A common Tibetan metaphor for this reflexivity is that of a lamp in a dark room which in the act of illuminating objects in the room also illuminates itself. Dzogchen meditative practices aim to bring the mind to direct realization of this luminous nature. In Dzogchen (as well as some Mahamudra traditions) Svasaṃvedana is seen as the primordial substratum or ground (gdod ma'i gzhi) of mind.

Following Je Tsongkhapa's (1357–1419) interpretation of the Prasaṅgika Madhyamaka view, the Gelug school completely denies both the conventional and the ultimate existence of reflexive awareness. This is one of Tsongkhapa's "eight difficult points" that distinguish the Prasaṅgika view from others. The Nyingma philosopher Jamgon Ju Mipham Gyatso (1846–1912) defended the conventional existence of reflexive awareness as per the Madhyamaka two truths doctrine. According to Mipham, the Prasangika critique of reflexive awareness only applied to its ultimate inherent reality and not its conventional status.

See also
 Buddha-nature
 Ösel (yoga)
 Rangtong-Shentong
 Rigpa
 Vijñāna

References

Dzogchen
Buddhist philosophical concepts
Consciousness
Rangtong-Shentong
Buddha-nature